The matching person and technology model is an organizational framework to assess and recommend successful use of a variety of assistive technologies for people with disabilities: educational technology, and those used in the workplace, school, home; for healthcare, for mobility and performing daily activities. Specialized devices for hearing loss, speech, eyesight and cognition as well as general or everyday technologies are also included. Research shows that although a technology may appear perfect for a given need, it may be used inappropriately or even go unused when critical personality preferences, psychosocial characteristics or needed environmental support are not considered. The use and non-use of technology as conceptualized in the Matching person and technology model has been validated by many researchers and authors representing the fields of occupational therapy, physical therapy, speech language pathology, psychology, and others. The matching person and technology model is operationalized by a series of reliable and valid measures that provide a person-centered and individualized approach to matching individuals with the most appropriate technologies for their use.  The matching person & technology model and measures were developed by Marcia J. Scherer beginning in 1986.

Assessment measures
 Initial worksheet for the matching person and technology (MPT) model—to determine initial goals, potential interventions, and technologies needed to support attainment of the goals. 
 History of support use—identifies supports used in the past and satisfaction with those supports.  
 Specific technology matching:
 General—survey of technology use
 Assistive—assistive technology device predisposition assessment, cognitive support technology predisposition assessment and hearing technology predisposition assessment
 Educational—educational technology device predisposition assessment
 Workplace—workplace technology device predisposition assessment
 Healthcare—healthcare technology device predisposition assessment
 Follow-up versions of the measures to determine degree of use, comparison of expected benefit and realization of benefit and change in functioning and subjective well-being.

See also 
 Lazy user model
 Technology acceptance model
 Technology adoption lifecycle

References
General
Cook, A.M. and Hussey, S. (2001). Assistive Technologies: Principles and Practice (2nd Edition). Publisher: Mosby: .
de Jonge, D., Scherer, M. & Rodger, S.  (2007).  Assistive Technology in the Workplace.  St. Louis, MO:  Mosby: .
Judge, S.L. & Parette, H.P. (1998). Assistive Technology for Young Children with Disabilities: A Guide to Family-Centered Services.  Cambridge, MA:  Brookline Books: .
Lasker, J.P & Bedrosian, J.L. (2001).  Promoting acceptance of augmentative and alternative communication by adults with acquired communication disorders.  Augmentative and Alternative Communication, 17(3), 141–53.  
Scherer, M. J. (2005).  Living in the State of Stuck:  How Assistive Technology Impacts the Lives of People with Disabilities, Fourth Edition.  Cambridge, MA:  Brookline Books: . 
Scherer, M.J.  (2004).  Connecting to Learn:  Educational and Assistive Technology for People with Disabilities.  Washington, DC:  American Psychological Association (APA) Books: .
Scherer, M.J. (Ed.).  (2002).  Assistive Technology:  Matching Device and Consumer for Successful Rehabilitation.  Washington, DC:  APA Books: .
Scherer, MJ & Sax, C.  (2009). Measures of assistive technology predisposition and use.  In E. Mpofu & T. Oakland (Eds.),  Assessment in Rehabilitation and Health.  Boston: Allyn & Bacon: .
Kirsch, N.L. & Scherer, M.J. (2009). Assistive technology for cognition and behavior.  In R.G. Frank, M. Rosenthal & B. Caplan (eds.), Handbook of Rehabilitation Psychology, 2nd edition. Washington, DC: APA Books: .
Scherer, M.J., Sax, C., Vanbeirvliet, A., Cushman, L.A. & Scherer, J.V.  (2005).  Predictors of assistive technology use:  The importance of personal and psychosocial factors. Disability & Rehabilitation, 27(21), 1321–1331.
Scherer, M. J. (1986).  Values in the creation, prescription, and use of technological aids and assistive devices for people with physical disabilities. Doctoral dissertation, University of Rochester, and final report to the National Science Foundation.  Dissertation Abstracts International, 48(01), 49.  (University Microfilms No. ADG87-08247).
Trish Wielandt, T., Mckenna, K., Tooth, L. & Strong, J. (2006).  Factors that predict the post-discharge use of recommended assistive technology (AT). Disability and Rehabilitation: Assistive Technology, 1(1/2), 29 – 40.
Specific

External links 

  Matching Person & Technology Homepage 
 Rehabilitation Engineering and Assistive Technology Society of North America

Assistive technology